The Deal is a 2005 political thriller film directed by Harvey Kahn, starring Christian Slater, Selma Blair, Robert Loggia and Colm Feore. The movie was filmed in 2004 and based in Boston, Massachusetts. The film was released only in limited cinemas of USA and United Arab Emirates.

Plot
With America at war and in the grip of a crippling fuel crisis, Wall Street analyst Tom Hanson (Slater) agrees to broker a lucrative deal between a Russian oil cartel and his investment firm's biggest client, led by cold-blooded CEO Jared Tolson (Loggia). While juggling his growing attraction to newly hired associate, Abby Gallagher (Blair) a Harvard graduate who wants to save the world and has an innovative idea for helping those seeking alternative energy sources further their research. The snake pit of Wall Street is the last place she wants to be, but Gordon  convinces her that his company can make her alternative energy dream a reality (because the company can make money by doing so). Tom learns all is not what it seems with the deal. Digging deeper, he and Abby soon find themselves trapped in a dangerous web of treachery and murder that will keep you guessing until the very end.

Cast

Reception
The review aggregator website Rotten Tomatoes surveyed  and, categorizing the reviews as positive or negative, assessed 7 as positive and 27 as negative for a 21 percent rating. Among the reviews, it determined an average rating of 4.50 out of 10. The critics consensus reads "Dense with detail but light on entertainment value, The Deal turns a potentially riveting subject into a sloppily assembled -- and progressively more implausible -- misfire."

References

External links
 
 

2005 films
2000s political thriller films
English-language Canadian films
2000s Russian-language films
American political thriller films
Canadian political thriller films
Films scored by Christopher Lennertz
Films about businesspeople
Wall Street films
2000s American films
2000s Canadian films